{{Infobox settlement
|settlement_type = municipality
|official_name = Concello de Fornelos de Montes 
| nickname = 
| image_flag = Fornelos de Montes flag.svg 
| image_seal = Fornelos de Montes.svg 
| image_map = Situacion Fornelos de Montes.PNG 
| map_caption = Location of the Municipality Fornelos de Montes within Galicia 
| pushpin_map             = Spain Province of Pontevedra#Spain Galicia#Spain
| pushpin_mapsize         = 
| pushpin_map_caption     = 
| pushpin_label           = Fornelos de Montes
| pushpin_label_position  = 
| pushpin_relief          = 
|subdivision_type  = Country
|subdivision_name  = 
|subdivision_type1 = Autonomous Community
|subdivision_name1 = 
|subdivision_type2 = Province
|subdivision_name2 = 
|subdivision_type3 = Comarca
|subdivision_name3 = Comarca de Vigo
| leader_title = Alcalde (Mayor) 
| leader_name = Serafín A. Martínez Martínez 
| area_note = 
| area_magnitude =  
| area_total = 
| area_land =   
| area_water =   

| population_as_of = 
| population_footnotes = 
| population_total = 
| population_density = 
| timezone = CET 
| utc_offset = +1 
| timezone_DST = CET 
| utc_offset_DST = +2 
|coordinates   = 
| website = 
| footnotes =  
| }}Fornelos de Montes''' is a municipality in Galicia, in the province of Pontevedra, Spain. It is composed of seven parishes: Calvos, Stakes, Fornelos de Montes (San Lorenzo), Lage, Oitaven (San Vicente), Traspielas (Santa Maria), and Ventin (San Miguel). It is known for having some of the most abundant rainfall in Galicia, an estimated 2862 mm per year. Fornelos de Montes is intersected by the Oitavén River, the Barragán River, and the Parada River in the Serra do Suído mountain range.

References

Municipalities in the Province of Pontevedra